Eloge Koffi Yao Guy (born 20 January 1996) is an Ivorian footballer who plays as a defender for Israeli club Hapoel Jerusalem.

Club career

Internazionale
Born in Akroukro, Ivory Coast, Yao was signed by the Serie A club Inter Milan from Parma in January 2012. The club sold the 50% registration rights of Jacopo Galimberti (€500,000) and Diego Mella (€500,000) for the 50% registration rights of Yao (€1 million). Yao spent the rest of the 2011–12 season with Parma's youth team. He was a member of Inter's under-17 team in 2012–13 season and was promoted to the reserve team in 2013. In June 2013, Yao's co-ownership contract was renewed. Inter also bought back Galimberti and Mella in €1.75 million cash plus the remain 50% rights of Nwankwo Obiora.

In June 2014, Parma bought back Ishak Belfodil for €5.75 million from Inter, with Lorenzo Crisetig (€4.75 million) and Yao (€1 million) moved to Inter outright.

Loan to Crotone 
On 10 July 2015, Yao was signed by the Serie B club  F.C. Crotone with a season-long loan deal. On 9 August he made his debut for Crotone in the second round of Coppa Italia in a 1–0 home win over Feralpisalò. On 14 August, Yao played in the third round of Coppa Italia as a substitute replacing Giuseppe Zampano in the 87th minute of a 1–0 home win against Ternana. On 7 September, he made his Serie B debut in a 4–0 away defeat against Cagliari. On 26 September, Yao scored his first professional goal in the 92nd minute of a 2–0 away win over Pro Vercelli. On 1 December, he played in the fourth round of Coppa Italia when he was replaced by Jacopo Galli in the 71st minute, in a 3–1 away defeat after extra time against A.C. Milan at San Siro. Yao ended his season-long loan to Crotone with 33 appearances and 1 goal, and at end of the season Crotone finished second in Serie B and was promoted to Serie A

Lugano
On 21 July 2017, Yao was signed by the Swiss Super League side FC Lugano for an undisclosed fee and a 2-year contract. On 20 August 2017, Yao mede his debut for Lugano in Swiss Super League as a substitute replacing Steve Rouiller in the 78th minute of a 1–1 away draw against Basel. On 14 September he made his UEFA Europa League debut with Lugano as a substitute replacing Steve Rouiller in the 46th minute of 2–1 away defeat against Hapoel Be'er Sheva. On 17 September, Yao played his first match in the Schweizer Pokal in the round of 32 in a 1–0 away win over Koniz.

Reggiana
On 14 January 2021, he signed a 1.5-year contract with the Serie B club Reggiana.

Hapoel Jerusalem
On 11 August 2021, Yao signed for Hapoel Jerusalem.

Career statistics

Club

References

External links
 

Living people
1996 births
People from Lacs District
Ivorian footballers
Parma Calcio 1913 players
Inter Milan players
F.C. Crotone players
FC Lugano players
A.C. Reggiana 1919 players
Hapoel Jerusalem F.C. players
Serie B players
Swiss Super League players
Israeli Premier League players
Ivorian expatriate footballers
Expatriate footballers in Italy
Expatriate footballers in Switzerland
Expatriate footballers in Israel
Ivorian expatriate sportspeople in Italy
Ivorian expatriate sportspeople in Switzerland
Ivorian expatriate sportspeople in Israel
Association football central defenders